Terry Babcock-Lumish is an American professor, entrepreneur, and policymaker. She is the Executive Secretary of the Harry S. Truman Scholarship Foundation.

Early life

Babcock-Lumish was born in Miami, Florida. Her father, Dr. Robert Lumish, was an infectious disease specialist and Chief of Infectious Diseases at UPMC Mercy Hospital.

Babcock-Lumish grew up in Pittsburgh, Pennsylvania, and attended Upper St. Clair High School. She received a Bachelor of Science from Carnegie Mellon University. While there, she won a Harry S. Truman Scholarship. She later earned a master's degree in public affairs from Indiana University School of Public and Environmental Affairs and a Doctor of Philosophy from University of Oxford, St. John's College.

Career
From 1999-2001, Babcock-Lumish worked for the United States Government as a fellow in the Presidential Management Fellows Program in the President's Council of Economic Advisers. Upon leaving the White House in 2001, she served as a researcher for two books by the Honorable Vice President Al Gore and Tipper Gore.

From 2002-2004, Babcock-Lumish served as an associate fellow and research associate at the Rothermere American Institute.

In 2005, Babcock-Lumish founded Islay Consulting LLC. Islay provides consulting services to include economic, policy, and political analysis.

From 2005-2008, Babcock-Lumish served as a senior research associate at Harvard Law School.
From there, she went on to serve as a visiting research associate at the Oxford University Centre for the Environment.

In January 2011, Babcock-Lumish was appointed as a Distinguished Lecturer and the first Newman Director of Public Policy at the Roosevelt House Public Policy Institute at Hunter College. In this position, Babcock-Lumish directed the public policy program.

From 2012-2014, Babcock-Lumish served as an assistant professor of economics at the United States Military Academy.

From 2019–Present, served as Executive Secretary of the Harry S. Truman Scholarship foundation.

Awards

Babcock-Lumish was named a Harry S. Truman Scholarship winner in 1996. She went on to earn the Harry S. Truman Scholarship Foundation's Elmer B. Staats Award, the Foundation's highest honor granted to one Truman Scholar annually.

Babcock-Lumish served as a Clarendon Scholarship recipient from 2002-2004 while reading her DPhil at Oxford.

In 2007, Babcock-Lumish received the young alumni award from Carnegie Mellon University.

In 2010, she won the Mexico International Film Festival Silver Palm Award as the consulting producer for the documentary Women on the Edge: The Mexican Immigrant Experience.

The American Swiss Foundation, the National Committee on US-China Relations' Young Leaders Forum, the Council for the US and Italy, and the British-American Project have all recognized Babcock-Lumish as a young leader.

Published works
 "Trust Network Sclerosis: The Hazard of Trust in Innovation Investment Communities", Journal of Financial Transformation, Vol. 29, pp. 163–172; 2009.

In this publication, Babcock-Lumish coined the term "trust network sclerosis," describing the phenomenon in which excessive reliance on trustworthiness results in a form of decision-making lock-in.
 Pricing the Economic Landscape: Global Financial Markets and the Communities and Institutions of Risk Management, ('Political Economies of Landscape'; 2008).]

Articles
 , "West Point and the Culinary Institute of America: An Exchange of Experiences", The New York Times, May 15, 2015
 , "My personal pivot to Asia", The Hill, August 22, 2014

Media appearances
Babcock-Lumish appeared on NBC's TODAY Show in 2014 in a segment titled Cadets, chefs break down barriers,

References

Economists from Florida
Carnegie Mellon University alumni
Living people
1976 births
Alumni of St John's College, Oxford
Upper St. Clair High School alumni
21st-century American economists